Barlow is an unincorporated community in western Barlow Township, Washington County, Ohio, United States.  Although it is unincorporated, it has a ZIP code 45712.  It lies at the intersection of State Routes 339 and 550 near the South Fork of Wolf Creek, which meets the Muskingum River at Waterford to the north.

History
Barlow was platted in 1840.

Education
Barlow has a public library, a branch of the Washington County Public Library.

References

Unincorporated communities in Washington County, Ohio
Unincorporated communities in Ohio